Izaguirre is a surname of Basque origin with roots in the Basque Country, especially Gipuzkoa and Navarre (Spain). It means 'prominence/clearing exposed to the wind'. "Eizaguirre" is a variant of the same form. 

The name may refer to:

Notable people
Boris Izaguirre (born 1965), Venezuelan-Spanish screenwriter, journalist, and showman
Emilio Izaguirre (born 1986), Honduran professional footballer
Júnior Izaguirre (born 1979), Honduran professional footballer
Leandro Izaguirre (1867–1941), Mexican painter, illustrator, and teacher
María Izaguirre (1891-1979), First lady of Mexico while husband Adolfo Ruiz Cortines was President
Pablo Alejandro Izaguirre (born 1970), Argentine professional footballer and coach
Silverio Izaguirre (1898–1935), Spanish Olympic footballer
Jose Miguel Izaguirre (born 2000), Music Producer, Songwriter, Musical Artist

See also
Gorka Izagirre
Jon Izagirre
Raul Yzaguirre, whose name is sometimes spelled Izaguirre

Basque-language surnames